Gibraltar Mountain is a peak in the Canadian Rockies, located  east of Upper Kananaskis Lake, Alberta. Named in 1928 due to its physical likeness to the Rock of Gibraltar in the Mediterranean Sea.

References

Two-thousanders of Alberta
Kananaskis Improvement District
Alberta's Rockies